Whose Wife? is a lost 1917 silent film drama directed by Rollin S. Sturgeon and starring Gail Kane. It was produced by the American Film Company and distributed by Mutual Film.

Cast
Gail Kane - Mary Melville
Elizabeth Taylor - Mrs. Melville (*not Elizabeth Taylor of MGM)
Edward Peil Sr. - John Herrick
Harry von Meter - Claude Varden
Ethel Ullman - Nitra Ruiz
Frank Rickert - Ramon Ruiz
Lucille Young - Elsie Brandenham (*as Lucille Younge)
Robert Klein - Tom Nelson
Amelia Widen - Herrick's Aunt

References

External links
 Whose Wife? at IMDb.com

1917 films
American silent feature films
American black-and-white films
Lost American films
Films directed by Rollin S. Sturgeon
Silent American drama films
1917 drama films
1917 lost films
Lost drama films
1910s American films